The Doric order was one of the three orders of ancient Greek and later Roman architecture; the other two canonical orders were the Ionic and the Corinthian. The Doric is most easily recognized by the simple circular capitals at the top of columns. Originating in the western Doric region of Greece, it is the earliest and, in its essence, the simplest of the orders, though still with complex details in the entablature above.

The Greek Doric column was fluted or smooth-surfaced, and had no base, dropping straight into the stylobate or platform on which the temple or other building stood. The capital was a simple circular form, with some mouldings, under a square cushion that is very wide in early versions, but later more restrained. Above a plain architrave, the complexity comes in the frieze, where the two features originally unique to the Doric, the triglyph and gutta, are skeuomorphic memories of the beams and retaining pegs of the wooden constructions that preceded stone Doric temples.  In stone they are purely ornamental. The relatively uncommon Roman and Renaissance Doric retained these, and often introduced thin layers of moulding or further ornament, as well as often using plain columns. More often they used versions of the Tuscan order, elaborated for nationalistic reasons by Italian Renaissance writers, which is in effect a simplified Doric, with un-fluted columns and a simpler entablature with no triglyphs or guttae. The Doric order was much used in Greek Revival architecture from the 18th century onwards; often earlier Greek versions were used, with wider columns and no bases to them.

The ancient architect and architectural historian Vitruvius associates the Doric with masculine proportions (the Ionic representing the feminine). It is also normally the cheapest of the orders to use. When the three orders are superposed, it is usual for the Doric to be at the bottom, with the Ionic and then the Corinthian above, and the Doric, as "strongest", is often used on the ground floor below another order in the storey above.

History

Greek

In their original Greek version, Doric columns stood directly on the flat pavement (the stylobate) of a temple without a base. With a height only four to eight times their diameter, the columns were the most squat of all the classical orders; their vertical shafts were fluted with 20 parallel concave grooves called arrises; and they were topped by a smooth capital that flared from the column to meet a square abacus at the intersection with the horizontal beam (architrave) that they carried. The Parthenon has the Doric design columns. It was most popular in the Archaic Period (750–480 BC) in mainland Greece, and also found in Magna Graecia (southern Italy), as in the three temples at Paestum. These are in the Archaic Doric, where the capitals spread wide from the column compared to later Classical forms, as exemplified in the Parthenon.

Pronounced features of both Greek and Roman versions of the Doric order are the alternating triglyphs and metopes. The triglyphs are decoratively grooved with two vertical grooves ("tri-glyph") and represent the original wooden end-beams, which rest on the plain architrave that occupies the lower half of the entablature. Under each triglyph are peglike "stagons" or "guttae" (literally: drops) that appear as if they were hammered in from below to stabilize the post-and-beam (trabeated) construction. They also served to "organize" rainwater runoff from above. The spaces between the triglyphs are the "metopes". They may be left plain, or they may be carved in low relief.

Spacing the triglyphs
The spacing of the triglyphs caused problems which took some time to resolve. A triglyph is centered above every column, with another (or sometimes two) between columns, though the Greeks felt that the corner triglyph should form the corner of the entablature, creating an inharmonious mismatch with the supporting column.

The architecture followed rules of harmony. Since the original design probably came from wooden temples and the triglyphs were real heads of wooden beams, every column had to bear a beam which lay across the centre of the column. Triglyphs were arranged regularly; the last triglyph was centred upon the last column (illustration, right: I.). This was regarded as the ideal solution which had to be reached.

Changing to stone cubes instead of wooden beams required full support of the architrave load at the last column. At the first temples the final triglyph was moved (illustration, right: II.), still terminating the sequence, but leaving a gap disturbing the regular order. Even worse, the last triglyph was not centered with the corresponding column. That "archaic" manner was not regarded as a harmonious design. The resulting problem is called  the doric corner conflict. Another approach was to apply a broader corner triglyph (III.) but was not really satisfying.

Because the metopes are somewhat flexible in their proportions, the modular space between columns ("intercolumniation") can be adjusted by the architect. Often the last two columns were set slightly closer together (corner contraction), to give a subtle visual strengthening to the corners. That is called the "classic" solution of the corner conflict (IV.). Triglyphs could be arranged in a harmonic manner again, and the corner was terminated with a triglyph, though the final triglyph and column were often not centered. Roman aesthetics did not demand that a triglyph form the corner, and filled it with a half (demi-) metope, allowing triglyphs centered over columns  (illustration, right, V.).

Temples
There are many theories as to the origins of the Doric order in temples. The term Doric is believed to have originated from the Greek-speaking Dorian tribes. One belief is that the Doric order is the result of early wood prototypes of previous temples. With no hard proof and the sudden appearance of stone temples from one period after the other, this becomes mostly speculation. Another belief is that the Doric was inspired by the architecture of Egypt. With the Greeks being present in Ancient Egypt as soon the 7th-century BC, it is possible that Greek traders were inspired by the structures they saw in what they would consider foreign land. Finally, another theory states that the inspiration for the Doric came from Mycenae. At the ruins of this civilization lies architecture very similar to the Doric order. It is also in Greece, which would make it very accessible.

Some of the earliest examples of the Doric order come from the 7th-century BC. These examples include the Temple of Apollo at Corinth and the Temple of Zeus at Nemea. Other examples of the Doric order include the 6th-century BC temples at Paestum in southern Italy, a region called Magna Graecia, which was settled by Greek colonists. Compared to later versions, the columns are much more massive, with a strong entasis or swelling, and wider capitals.

The Temple of the Delians is a "peripteral" Doric order temple, the largest of three dedicated to Apollo on the island of Delos. It was begun in 478 BC and never completely finished. During their period of independence from Athens, the Delians reassigned the temple to the island of Poros. It is "hexastyle", with six columns across the pedimented end and thirteen along each long face. All the columns are centered under a triglyph in the frieze, except for the corner columns. The plain, unfluted shafts on the columns stand directly on the platform (the stylobate), without bases. The recessed "necking" in the nature of fluting at the top of the shafts and the wide cushionlike echinus may be interpreted as slightly self-conscious archaising features, for Delos is Apollo's ancient birthplace. However, the similar fluting at the base of the shafts might indicate an intention for the plain shafts to be capable of wrapping in drapery.

A classic statement of the Greek Doric order is the Temple of Hephaestus in Athens, built about 447 BC. The contemporary Parthenon, the largest temple in classical Athens, is also in the Doric order, although the sculptural enrichment is more familiar in the Ionic order: the Greeks were never as doctrinaire in the use of the Classical vocabulary as Renaissance theorists or Neoclassical architects. The detail, part of the basic vocabulary of trained architects from the later 18th century onwards, shows how the width of the metopes was flexible: here they bear the famous sculptures including the battle of Lapiths and Centaurs.

Roman
In the Roman Doric version, the height of the entablature has been reduced. The endmost triglyph is centered over the column rather than occupying the corner of the architrave. The columns are slightly less robust in their proportions. Below their caps, an astragal molding encircles the column like a ring. Crown moldings soften transitions between frieze and cornice and emphasize the upper edge of the abacus, which is the upper part of the capital. Roman Doric columns also have moldings at their bases and stand on low square pads or are even raised on plinths. In the Roman Doric mode, columns are not invariably fluted. Since the Romans did not insist on a triglyph covered corner, now both columns and triglyphs could be arranged equidistantly again and centered together. The architrave corner needed to be left "blank," which is sometimes referred to as a half, or demi-, metope (illustration, V., in Spacing the Columns above).

The Roman architect Vitruvius, following contemporary practice, outlined in his treatise the procedure for laying out constructions based on a module, which he took to be one half a column's diameter, taken at the base. An illustration of Andrea Palladio's Doric order, as it was laid out, with modules identified, by Isaac Ware, in The Four Books of Palladio's Architecture (London, 1738) is illustrated at Vitruvian module.

According to Vitruvius, the height of Doric columns is six or seven times the diameter at the base. This gives the Doric columns a shorter, thicker look than Ionic columns, which have 8:1 proportions. It is suggested that these proportions give the Doric columns a masculine appearance, whereas the more slender Ionic columns appear to represent a more feminine look. This sense of masculinity and femininity was often used to determine which type of column would be used for a particular structure.

The most influential, and perhaps the earliest, use of the Doric in Renaissance architecture was in the circular Tempietto by Donato Bramante (1502 or later), in the courtyard of San Pietro in Montorio, Rome.

Graphics of ancient forms

Modern

Before Greek Revival architecture grew, initially in England, in the 18th century, the Greek or elaborated Roman Doric order had not been very widely used, though "Tuscan" types of round capitals were always popular, especially in less formal buildings. It was sometimes used in military contexts, for example the Royal Hospital Chelsea (1682 onwards, by Christopher Wren). The first engraved illustrations of the Greek Doric order dated to the mid-18th century. Its appearance in the new phase of Classicism brought with it new connotations of high-minded primitive simplicity, seriousness of purpose, noble sobriety.

In Germany it suggested a contrast with the French, and in the United States republican virtues. In a customs house, Greek Doric suggested incorruptibility; in a Protestant church a Greek Doric porch promised a return to an untainted early church; it was equally appropriate for a library, a bank or a trustworthy public utility. The revived Doric did not return to Sicily until 1789, when a French architect researching the ancient Greek temples designed an entrance to the Botanical Gardens in Palermo.

Examples
Ancient Greek, Archaic
Temple of Artemis, Corfu, the earliest known stone Doric temple
Temple of Hera, Olympia
Delphi, temple of Apollo
The three temples at Paestum, Italy
Valle dei Templi, Agrigento, Temple of Juno, Agrigento and others
Temple of Aphaea

Ancient Greek, Classical
Temple of Zeus, Olympia
Temple of Hephaestus
Bassae, Temple of Apollo
Parthenon, Athens
Sounion, Temple of Poseidon

Renaissance and Baroque
The Tempietto by Donato Bramante, in the courtyard of San Pietro in Montorio, Rome 
Palace of Charles V, Granada, 1527, circular arcade in the courtyard, under Ionic in the upper storey 
Basilica Palladiana, in Vicenza, Andrea Palladio, 1546 on, arcade under Ionic above 
Valladolid Cathedral, Juan de Herrera, begun 1589

Neoclassical and Greek Revival
Brandenburg Gate, Berlin, 1788
The Grange, Northington, 1804
Neue Wache, Berlin, 1816
Royal High School, Edinburgh, completed 1829
Walhalla, Regensburg, Bavaria, 1842
Propylaea, Munich, 1854

United States 
Second Bank of the United States, Philadelphia, 1824
Naval Medical Center Portsmouth, 1827, pedimented temple front with ten columns 
Harding Tomb in Marion, Ohio, is a circular Greek temple design with Doric columns.

Gallery

See also

Geison

References

Sources
Labeled Doric Column
Summerson, John, The Classical Language of Architecture, 1980 edition, Thames and Hudson World of Art series, 
James Stevens Curl, Classical Architecture: An Introduction to Its Vocabulary and Essentials, with a Select Glossary of Terms
Georges Gromort, The Elements of Classical Architecture
Alexander Tzonis, Classical Architecture: The Poetics of Order (Alexander Tzonis website)

External links

Classical orders and elements

Orders of columns
Ancient Greek architecture
Order